Islamic literature is literature written by Muslim people, influenced by an Islamic cultural perspective, or literature that portrays Islam. It can be written in any language and portray any country or region. It includes many literary forms including adabs, a non-fiction form of Islamic advice literature, and various fictional literary genres.

In the 2000s academics have moved beyond evaluations of differences between Islamic and non-Islamic literature to studies such as comparisons of the  novelization of various contemporary Islamic literatures and points of confluency with political themes, such as nationalism.

Literary genres

Fiction 
The best known fiction from the Islamic world is The Book of One Thousand and One Nights (Arabian Nights), a compilation of many earlier folk tales set in a frame story of being told serially by the Persian Queen Scheherazade. The compilation took form in the 10th century and reached its final form by the 14th century; the number and type of tales have varied from one manuscript to another. Many other Arabian fantasy tales were often called "Arabian Nights" when translated into English, regardless of whether they appeared in any version of The Book of One Thousand and One Nights or not, and a number of tales are known in Europe as "Arabian Nights", despite existing in no Arabic manuscript.

This compilation has been influential in the West since it was first translated by Antoine Galland in the 18th century. Many imitations were written, especially in France.

In the 12th Century, Ibn Tufail (Abubacer) and Ibn al-Nafis were the  pioneers of the philosophical novel. Ibn Tufail wrote the first Arabic novel, Hayy ibn Yaqdhan, or Philosophus Autodidactus (The Self-Taught Philosopher), as a response to al-Ghazali's The Incoherence of the Philosophers. Ibn al-Nafis then wrote his novel Theologus Autodidactus (The Self-Taught Theologian) in response to Ibn Tufail’s work. The protagonists of both these narratives were feral children (Hayy in Philosophus Autodidactus and Kamil in Theologus Autodidactus) who were autodidactic (self-taught) and living in seclusion on a desert island. These works are the earliest examples of a desert island story. However, while Hayy lives alone with animals on the desert island for the rest of the story, Kamil's story extends beyond the desert island setting, developing into the earliest known coming of age plot and eventually becoming the first example of a science fiction novel.

A Latin translation of Philosophus Autodidactus first appeared in 1671, prepared by Edward Pococke the Younger, followed by an English translation by Simon Ockley in 1708, as well as German and Dutch translations. These translations later inspired Daniel Defoe to write Robinson Crusoe, regarded as the first novel in English. Philosophus Autodidactus also inspired Robert Boyle to write his own philosophical novel set on an island, The Aspiring Naturalist. The story also anticipated Rousseau's Emile in some ways, and resembles Mowgli's story in Kipling's The Jungle Book and Edgar Rice Burroughs's Tarzan in that a baby is abandoned but taken care of and fed by a mother wolf.

Poetry 

Cultural Muslim poetry is influenced by both Islamic metaphors and local poetic forms of various regions including the Arabic tradition of Qasida actually beginning since ancient pre-Islamic times. Some Sufi traditions are known for their devotional poetry. Arab poetry influenced the rest of Muslim poetry world over. Likewise Persian poetry too shared its influences beyond borders of modern-day Iran particularly in south Asian languages like Urdu Bengali etc.. Genres present in classical Persian poetry vary and are determined by rhyme, which consists of a vowel followed by a single-rhyming letter. The most common form of Persian poetry comes in the ghazal, a love-themed short poem made of seven to twelve verses and composed in the monorhyme scheme. Urdu poetry is known for its richness, multiple genres, traditions of live public performances through  Mushairas, Qawwali and  Ghazal singing in modern times.

Ferdowsi's Shahnameh, the national epic poem of Iran, is a mythical and heroic retelling of Persian history. Amir Arsalan was also a popular mythical Persian story, which has influenced some modern works of fantasy fiction, such as The Heroic Legend of Arslan.

Beginning in the 15th century  Bengali poetry, originating depicts the themes of internal conflict with the nafs, Islamic cosmology, historical battles, love and existential ideas concerning one’s relationship with society. The historical works of Shah Muhammad Sagir, Alaol, Abdul Hakim, Syed Sultan and Daulat Qazi mixed Bengali folk poetry with Perso-Arabian stories and themes, and are considered an important part of the Muslim culture of Bengal.  Ginans  are devotional hymns or poems recited by Shia Ismaili Muslims.

Dante Alighieri's Divine Comedy, considered the greatest epic of Italian literature, derived many features of and episodes about the hereafter directly or indirectly from Arabic works on Islamic eschatology: the Hadith and the Kitab al-Miraj (translated into Latin in 1264 or shortly before as Liber scalae Machometi, "The Book of Muhammad's Ladder") concerning Muhammad's ascension to Heaven, and the spiritual writings of Ibn Arabi.

Medieval adab works

One term for this is adab. Although today adab denotes literature generally, in earlier times its meaning included all that a well-informed person had to know in order to pass in society as a cultured and refined individual. This meaning started with the basic idea that adab was the socially accepted ethical and moral quality of an urbane and courteous person'; thus adab can also denote the category of Islamic law dealing with etiquette, or a gesture of greeting.

According to Issa J. Boullata,

Key early adab anthologies were the al-Mufaḍḍaliyyāt of Al-Mufaḍḍal al-Ḍabbī (d. c. 780 CE); Abū Tammām's Dīwān al-Ḥamāsa (d. 846 CE); ʿUyūn al-Akhbār, compiled by Ibn Qutayba (d. 889 CE); and Ibn ʿAbd Rabbih's al-ʿIqd al-Farīd (d. 940 CE).

Role in Islamisation 
Some scholar's studies attribute role of Islamisation of Muslim individuals and communities, social, cultural and political behavior by legitimization through various genres like Muslim historiographies, Islamic advice literature and other Islamic literature.

Literary prizes

Booker prize
The British Indian novelist and essayist Salman Rushdie's (b.1947) second novel, Midnight's Children won the Booker Prize in 1981 and was deemed to be "the best novel of all winners" on two separate occasions, marking the 25th and the 40th anniversary of the prize. In 1989, in an interview following the fatwa against him for alleged blaspheme in his novel The Satanic Verses, Rushdie said that he was in a sense a lapsed Muslim, though "shaped by Muslim culture more than any other", and a student of Islam.

Oman author Jokha Alharthi (b.1978) was the first Arabic-language writer to win the Man Booker International Prize in 2019 with her novel "Celestial Bodies." The book focuses on three Omani sisters and the country's history of slavery.

Nobel prize                                     
The 1988 Nobel Prize in Literature was given to the Egyptian author Naguib Mahfouz (1911–2006), "who, through works rich in nuance—now clear-sightedly realistic, now evocatively ambiguous—has formed an Arabian narrative art that applies to all mankind".
He was the first Muslim author to receive such a prize. With regard to religion  Mahfouz describes himself as, "a pious moslem believer". 

The 2006 Nobel Prize in Literature was awarded to the Turkish author Orhan Pamuk "(b. 1952) famous for his novels My Name Is Red and Snow, "who in the quest for the melancholic soul of his native city has discovered new symbols for the clash and interlacing of cultures".
Pamuk was the  first Turk to receive the Nobel Prize, He describes himself as a Cultural Muslim who associates the historical and cultural identification with the religion while not believing in a personal connection to God. When asked if he considered himself a Muslim, Pamuk replied: ": "I consider myself a person who comes from a Muslim culture. In any case, I would not say that I'm an atheist. So I'm a Muslim who associates historical and cultural identification with this religion. I do not believe in a personal connection to God; that's where it gets transcendental. I identify with my culture, but I am happy to be living on a tolerant, intellectual island where I can deal with Dostoyevsky and Sartre, both great influences for me".

International Prize for Arabic Fiction
The International Prize for Arabic Fiction is a literary prize managed in association with the Booker Prize Foundation in London and supported by the Emirates Foundation in Abu Dhabi. The prize is for prose fiction by Arabic authors. Each year, the winner of the prize receives US$50,000 and the six shortlisted authors receive US$10,000 each. The aim of the award is to recognise and reward excellence in contemporary Arabic fiction writing and to encourage wider readership of good-quality Arabic literature in the region and internationally. The prize is also designed to encourage the translation and promotion of Arabic language literature into other major world languages. An independent board of trustees, drawn from across the Arab world and beyond, is responsible for appointing six new judges each year, and for the overall management of the prize.

King Faisal Prize
The King Faisal Prize is an annual award sponsored by King Faisal Foundation presented to "dedicated men and women whose contributions make a positive difference".  The foundation awards prizes in five categories: Service to Islam; Islamic studies; the Arabic language and Arabic literature; science; and medicine. Three of the prizes are widely considered as the most prestigious awards in the Muslim world.

See also
Arabic literature
Arabic epic literature
Medieval Arabic female poets
Indonesian literature
Javanese literature
Iranian literature
Kurdish literature
Persian literature
Somali literature
South Asian literature
Bengali literature
Gujarati literature
Kashmiri literature
Pakistani literature 
Pakistani literature in English
Pashto literature
Persian literature
Punjabi literature
Sindhi literature
Urdu literature
Turkic literature
Azerbaijani literature
Turkish literature
Uzbek literature
Other
Postcolonial literature
 Liberalism and progressivism within Islam

References

External links
 
 Islamic Literature at Cornell University.
 Brief article on the growth of the influence of Islamic literature in the U.S.
 CWANA (Central and West Asia and North Africa) Canonical Texts
 Maḫzan al-asrār. Niżāmī raqm-i Muḥammad. Dessinateur 1538 AD